Yasin Pehlivan (born 5 January 1989) is an Austrian professional footballer who plays as a midfielder for Turkish club Sakaryaspor. He is also part of the Austria national team. Since his debut in 2009, he was capped 17 times.

Club career
Pehlivan began his career 1998 with Breitensee/Wat 16 (WS Ottakring) and signed in 2000 a loan deal with First Vienna FC. Than after two years turned back for a short stint and moved now on loan to SK Rapid Wien after two seasons with good performance for Rapid sold the club him.

His good performance brought him the call to the first team in January 2009 from SK Rapid Wien and made his debut on 22 February 2009 against Red Bull Salzburg, on 14 March 2009 scored his first goal against Kapfenberger SV.

He moved to Turkish Süper Lig side Gaziantepspor on 27 May 2011, signing a five-year contract.

At the end of the season, he signed a three-year-contract with another Süper Lig side Bursaspor on 21 June 2013.

On 22 August 2015, Pehlivan signed for FC Red Bull Salzburg on a one-year deal.

International career
Pehlivan received his first call-up for Austria in winter 2008–09 but only made his debut against Italy national under-21 football team on 11 February 2009. He played also his one and only game for Austria U-20 against Germany on 12 October 2008. He made two games in the Year 2009 for the Austria national team with new coach Didi Constantini.

Personal life
Pehlivan was born to Turkish parents. He also holds Turkish citizenship.

Honours 
Red Bull Salzburg
 Austrian Bundesliga: 2015–16
 Austrian Cup: 2015–16

Spartak Trnava
 Slovak Super Liga: 2017–18

References

External links

Rapid stats - Rapid Site

1989 births
Footballers from Vienna
Austrian people of Turkish descent
Living people
Austrian footballers
Austria youth international footballers
Austria under-21 international footballers
Austria international footballers
Association football midfielders
First Vienna FC players
SK Rapid Wien players
Gaziantepspor footballers
Bursaspor footballers
Kayseri Erciyesspor footballers
FC Red Bull Salzburg players
FC Spartak Trnava players
Gençlerbirliği S.K. footballers
Çaykur Rizespor footballers
Manisa FK footballers
Sakaryaspor footballers
Austrian Football Bundesliga players
Süper Lig players
Slovak Super Liga players
TFF First League players
Austrian expatriate footballers
Expatriate footballers in Turkey
Austrian expatriate sportspeople in Turkey
Expatriate footballers in Slovakia
Austrian expatriate sportspeople in Slovakia